Doto can refer to:  

Doto (mythology), one of the Nereids
Doto (gastropod), a genus of sea-slug

It can also refer to:  
DOTO, the former Dutch football club Door Ontwikkeling Tot Ontspanning 
Dotö, one of the Tibetan names for the Kham region